Miika Aulio (born 19 November 1975) is a Finnish archer. He competed in the men's individual event at the 2000 Summer Olympics.

References

1975 births
Living people
Finnish male archers
Olympic archers of Finland
Archers at the 2000 Summer Olympics
Sportspeople from Helsinki